Nyeboe Land is a peninsula in far northwestern Greenland. It is a part of the Northeast Greenland National Park.

History
Nyeboe Land was named after engineer Marius Nyeboe (1867–1946), chairman of the committee of Knud Rasmussen's Fifth Thule Expedition.

Geography
Nyeboe Land is located to the northeast of Hall Land in the west, and southwest of Hendrik Island and west of Warming Land and the Steensby Glacier in the east. It is bounded to the north by the Lincoln Sea and to the east by Saint George Fjord. Newman Fjord (Newman Bay) marks the western limit of Nyeboe Land. To the south and southeast the peninsula is attached to the mainland and its ice cap. The Dreyer Firn is located in the southwest, near the Saint George Fjord's shore. There are three small bays in the northern shore, Repulse Harbour, Hand Bay and Frankfield Bay, from west to east.

Nyeboe Land is largely unglaciated and mountainous.   high Punch Mountain, the highest elevation of the peninsula, is located at the northern end. Other important summits are Korsgård Mountain, Mount Wyatt and Nina Bang Mountain.

See also
Nyeboe Land Formation
Sirius Dog Sled Patrol

References

External links 
Peter R. Dawes, The Nyeboe Land fault zone: a major dislocation on the Greenland coast along northern Nares Strait 

Peninsulas of Greenland